"Dincolo de nori" (English: "Beyond the Clouds") is a song recorded by Romanian singer Dan Bittman at the Magic Sound Production in Craiova and was released as a CD single in 1994 by Metro Records Romania. "Dincolo de nori" was written by Antonio Furtuna and Bittman and produced solely by Furtuna, featuring a bass guitar, harmonica and keyboards in its instrumentation.

The track represented  in the Eurovision Song Contest 1994 (held in Dublin, Ireland) after winning the pre-selection show Selecția Națională. In Dublin, Romania made its debut in the contest and finished in 21st place with 14 points. This remained Romania's worst result until their . One year after the event, "Dincolo de nori" was awarded Song of the Year by Romanian magazine . The song was re-recorded in 1998 by Bittman and his group Holograf for their 12th studio album Supersonic.

Background and release
"Dincolo de nori" was written by Antonio Furtuna and Dan Bittman, while production was solely handled by Furtuna. It was recorded and mixed at Magic Sound Production in Craiova, Romania by Furtuna and Radu Negru, respectively. The song featured several instruments in its instrumentation, including a bass guitar played by Eugen Tegu, keyboards by Furtuna and harmonica by Bittman. Corina Dogaru, Geanina Olaru, Mariana Țurcanu and Daniela Vlădescu were hired as backing vocalists to complement lead vocals performed by Bittman. A CD of "Dincolo de nori" was released in 1994, containing the tracks "When the Love Was In" and "Mother Mary" on different sides. Its cover was designed by Hary Dumitrescu and photographed by Adrian Popescu. In 1998, "Dincolo de nori" was re-recorded by Bittman and his band Holograf for their 12th studio album Supersonic.

At Eurovision
On 20 March 1994, the Selecția Națională (National Selection) was held in order to select the Romanian entrant for the Eurovision Song Contest 1994. "Dincolo de nori" was chosen after the votes of five regional professional jury panels were combined. The Eurovision Song Contest 1994 took place at the Point Theatre in Dublin, Ireland, and the finals were held on 30 April 1994. According to the then-Eurovision rules, selected countries were picked to participate in the final.

Track listing
Romanian CD single
"Dincolo de nori" – 3:06
"When the Love Was In" – 3:06
"Mother Mary" – 2:36
"When the Love Was In" – 3:04

Credits and personnel
Credits adapted from the liner notes of the CD single.

Management
Published by Metro Records Romania
Recorded and mixed at Magic Sound Production (Craiova, Romania)

Personnel

Dan Bittman – lead vocals, composer, harmonica
Corina Dogaru – backing vocals
Antonio Furtuna – composer, producer, keyboards
Geanina Olaru – backing vocals
Eugen Tegu – bass guitar
Mariana Țurcanu – backing vocals
Daniela Vlădescu – backing vocals

Release history

References

Eurovision songs of Romania
Eurovision songs of 1994
Romanian songs
1994 songs